Haplosporidium is a genus under order Haplosporida. 

They are a group of eukaryotes that are parasites of marine invertebrates, causing multiple disease which has high mortality to its host, including the notorious disease MSX, which caused massive oyster mortalities in Delaware Bay in 1957 and two years later in Chesapeake Bay. 

There are four genus under order haplosporida, according to the Hand book of the Protists(2017), The principal characteristics of this genus are spores with an apical-hinged operculum and a variety of extensions externally (tails, filaments, extensions, wrapping, folds, and epispore extensions) formed by the same material of the spore wall. The number of ornaments is variable according to the different species. The internal uninucleated endosporoplasm contains a spherulosome (structure formerly designated by the name “spherule”), generally located at the apical region of the spore, several haplosporosomes, and mitochondria.

Species
 Haplosporidium armoricanum (Van Banning, 1977)
 Haplosporidium ascidiarum Duboscq & Harrant, 1923
 Haplosporidium cadomensis Marchand & Sprague, 1979
 Haplosporidium caulleryi Mercier & Poisson, 1922
 Haplosporidium comatulae La Haye, Holland & McLean, 1984
 Haplosporidium costale Wood & Andrews, 1962
 Haplosporidium edule  Azevedo, Conchas & Montes, 2003 -  parasitizes the digestive gland tissues of the cockle Cerastoderma edule in Galicia (northwest Spain) and has tape-like filaments.
 Haplosporidium heterocirri Caullery & Mesnil, 1899
 Haplosporidium hinei Bearham, Spiers, Raidal, Jones, Burreson & Nicholls, 2008
 Haplosporidium louisiana infects crabs, Panopeus herbstii in the USA, They are probably conspecific and regarded as H. louisiana. This species is phylogenetically basal to other Haplosporidium spp.
 Haplosporidium lusitanicum Azevedo, 1984 - parasitizes the gills and visceral tissues of Helcion pellucidus (Mollusca, Gastropoda). In the basal region of the spore, the wall is thicker and gives rise to two long tape-like proteinaceous filaments.
 Haplosporidium montforti Azevedo, Balseiro, Casal, Gestal, Aranguren, Stokes, Carnegie, Novoa, Burreson & Figueras, 2006
 Haplosporidium montforti infects the connective tissue, gill, digestive gland, and foot muscle of the abalone, Haliotis tuberculata, imported from Ireland and experimentally grown in Galicia, Spain.
 Haplosporidium nelsoni Haskin, Stauber & Mackin, 1966 - infected the eastern oyster (Crassostrea virginica), causing the disease MSX.
 Haplosporidium nemertis Debaisieux, 1920
 Haplosporidium parisi Ormières, 1980
 Haplosporidium pinnae very likely responsible for mass mortality of fan mussels, Pinna nobilis, in the Western Mediterranean Sea.
 Haplosporidium tumefacientis Taylor, 1966

Disease
MSX(Multinucleated Sphere Unknown) is the disease caused by Haplosporidium nelsoni, MSX is lethal to the eastern oyster (Crassostrea virginica), The early MSX infections are found in the oyster’s gill. The infection spreads to the digestive diverticulum, and finally all the tissues of the oyster are filled with plasmodia.
MSX infection is not directly transmissible from oyster to oyster. How the infection is transmitted is not yet known. Several researchers believe that an intermediate host is part of the life cycle of this parasite, but what the host is remains unknown. MSX disease is suppressed by low salinities and low temperatures.

References

Citations
1. John M. ArchibaldAlastair G.B. SimpsonClaudio H. Slamovits(2017). Handbook of the Protists.

2.Inke Sunila, State Shellfish Pathologist. Connecticut Department of Agriculture Bureau of Aquaculture and Laboratory Milford, Connecticut 06460. MSX DISEASE

3.Gaetano Catanese, Amalia Grau, Jose Maria Valencia, Jose Rafael Garcia-March, Maite Vázquez-Luis, Elvira Alvarez, Salud Deudero, Susana Darriba, María J. Carballal, Antonio Villalba.(2018). Haplosporidium pinnae sp. nov., a haplosporidan parasite associated with mass mortalities of the fan mussel, Pinna nobilis, in the Western Mediterranean Sea.

Other sources
1.Isabelle Arzul, Ryan B. Carnegie.(2015) New perspective on the haplosporidan parasites of molluscs
https://www.researchgate.net/publication/280998012_New_Perspective_On_The_Haplosporidian_Parasites_Of_Molluscs

Endomyxa
Cercozoa genera